Sammy Gronemann (Strasburg, Westpreußen, 21 March 1875 – Tel Aviv, 6 March 1952) was a German-born Zionist activist, author and satirist.

Biography
Samuel (Sammy) Gronemann was the son of the chief rabbi of Hannover. 

Gronemann was the chief judge of the Zionist Congress Court and founder of its Court of Honour (1921–1946). He was a major contributor to the satirical magazine Schlemiel published in 1903–1905 and 1919–1924. 

In 1933, after the rise of the Nazis, he fled to Paris with his wife, Sonja and immigrated to Mandate Palestine in 1936.In 1937, the Jewish National Fund sent him to France to speak about the plight of the Jews in Palestine thanks to his knowledge of French and French culture.

Published works 
 Tohuwabohu. 1920 novel
Hawdoloh und Zapfenstreich. 1924 novel
Hamans Flucht. Vienna, R. Löwit, 1926.
Schalet. Beiträge zur Philosophie des „Wenn schon“. 1927 
Der Weise und der Narr: with an introduction by Margot Klausner . Tel-Aviv: Moadim, Palestinian Play Publishers, 1942.
Der Prozess um des Esels Schatten. Tel-Aviv: Moadim, Palestinian Play Publishers, 1945.
Erinnerungen. Berlin: Philo, 2002. 
Erinnerungen an meine Jahre in Berlin. Berlin: Philo, 2004.

References

External links

1875 births
1952 deaths
Burials at Nahalat Yitzhak Cemetery